Craig Shipbuilding  was a shipbuilding company in Long Beach, California. To support the World War I demand for ships Craig Shipbuilding shipyard switched over to military construction and built: US Navy Submarines and Cargo Ships. Craig Shipbuilding was started in 1906 by John F. Craig.  John F. Craig had worked in Toledo, Ohio with his father, John Craig (1838-1934), and Blythe Craig, both shipbuilders, their first ship was built in 1864 at Craig Shipbuilding Toledo. John F. Craig opened his shipbuilding company in Port of Long Beach on the south side of Channel 3, the current location of Pier 41 in the inner harbor, becoming the port's first shipyard. In 1907 Craig Shipbuilding is given a contract to dredge a channel from the Pacific ocean to the inner harbor.  In 1917 Craig sold the shipyard to the short-lived California Shipbuilding Company. but then opened a new shipyard next to the one he just sold and called it the Long Beach Shipbuilding Company. The Long Beach Shipbuilding Company built cargo ships in 1918, 1919, and 1920 for the United States Shipping Board.

In 1918 California Shipbuilding started to have difficulties completing contracts that it had purchased with the Craig Shipyard, including two submarines and a lighthouse tender. In 1921, Craig purchased his original shipyard back and renamed it back to Craig Shipbuilding. At the same time he renamed the Long Beach Shipbuilding to Craig Shipbuilding and ran both as one company. The tow shipyard did repair work on built yachts.

The United States Maritime Commission started a shipbuilding program in 1939, to support the World War 2 demand for ships. Craig leased the Long Beach Shipbuilding yard to the Consolidated Steel Corporation. Consolidated Steel built Type C1-B and C1-M cargo merchant ships and two Type P1 passenger ships at the leased yard.  Consolidated Steel operated two other large shipyards, one nearby in the Port of Los Angeles West Basin in Wilmington, the other in Orange, Texas, and two other small boatyards. After World war 2, the Consolidated leased yard closed. Craig shipyard continued to do repair work as the Long Beach Marine Repair and closed in 1970.

Craig Shipbuilding Toledo
Notable ships built at Craig Shipbuilding Toledo (1864-1905), later purchased by a syndicate of investors in 1905 and renamed Toledo Shipbuilding Company, and then purchased in 1945 by the American Ship Building Company. Run today by the Toledo-Lucas County Port Authority:
Two schooners, the James H. Seguine and Edwin Kirk in 1864 at Keyport, New Jersey
Amelia G. Ireland, built at Wicomico Creek, Maryland in 1866 
 Schooner Jane Ralston for Robert W. Linn. Craig started partnership with Linn: Linn & Craig
 Manistique in 1882 as John Craig & Son (with George Losee Craig); son John Franklin Craig joins in 1889; yard moves to Toledo.
E.G. Crosby (1903)
City of South Haven
Lakeside
City of Benton Harbor, the subject of a Supreme Court case
Indianapolis 
Chippewa
 SS George M. Cox (SS Puritan) 1901 steel passenger screw-steamer, 495 tons, wrecked May 27, 1933.
Detroiter, 1902
Light Vessel No.57
SS City of South Haven
SS Harriet B.
SS Puritan
John C. Barr tug
Grays Reef Light
SS Grand Haven
LV55, LV56, and LV57 at the Lansing Shoals Light Station, Light vessels
United States lightship Nantucket (LV-58)
 Many tugs, propellers, barges, car ferries, light ships and passenger boats

Craig Shipbuilding Long Beach Yard
Notable ships built at Craig Shipbuilding Long Beach Yard (1906 to 1 January 1916, when it was bought by the California Shipbuilding Company) and (1922-1934):
Paraiso, built 1912
 completed by California S.B. Co.
 USLHT Cedar, US Coast Guard lighthouse/buoy tender, 1,890 tons, 1917
 USS L-6 (SS-45), US Navy submarine, 1917
 USS L-7 (SS-46), US Navy submarine, 1917
Infanta, built 1930 for the actor John Barrymore (120-foot steel-hulled cruiser)
Velero III, built 1931 for George Allan Hancock
USS Amethyst, built 1931
Georganna, built 1925
Caroline, built 1931 for Eldridge R. Johnson, later converted to motor torpedo boat tender
Geoanna, 1934 schooner

In 1932 Craig reconditioned 2 cargo vessels for Swayne & Hoyt, including the installation of a low pressure turbine at the
exhaust end of the triple-expansion engine to increase the speed of the ships.

Long Beach Shipbuilding Company

The yard was the smallest of the three steel shipyards in the Ports of Los Angeles and Long Beach active during the World War I shipbuilding boom, responsible for 17% of the tonnage produced there. The Llewellyn Iron Works of Los Angeles produced engines for a number of yards on the West Coast. It is unknown whether a particular hull was towed to them for outfitting or their engine delivered to the yard.

Other notable ships built at Long Beach Shipbuilding Company Long Beach Yard (1918-1921): 

 Edythe, yacht built in 1920 for owner John F. Craig; 186 tons; later sold and renamed Melodie
 Mazatlan, 987 ton cargo ship for Swayne & Hoyt shipping; later renamed San Diegan in 1937

Consolidated Steel at the Long Beach Shipyard

The Llewellyn Iron Works, builder of marine engines for ships launched from Long Beach during World War I was one of the companies merged into Consolidated Steel. Consolidated did not build any engines during World War II.

See: Consolidated Steel Corporation#Long Beach shipyard

Shipbuilding in Los Angeles and Long Beach

 West Basin
 Consolidated Steel Wilmington
 Los Angeles Shipbuilding and Dry Dock Company
 Western Pipe and Steel
 Terminal Island
 Southwestern Shipbuilding Company
 Bethlehem San Pedro
 California Shipbuilding Corporation
 Al Larson Boat Shop
 Long Beach
 Long Beach Shipbuilding Company
 Consolidated Steel Long Beach
 United Concrete Pipe Corporation, Steel Shipbuilding Division

See also
California during World War II#Ship building
Maritime history of California

References

American boat builders
Ships built in Toledo, Ohio